Document Schema Definition Languages (DSDL) is a framework within which multiple validation tasks of different types can be applied to an XML document in order to achieve more complete validation results than just the application of a single technology.

It is specified as a multi-part ISO/IEC Standard, ISO/IEC 19757. It was developed by ISO/IEC JTC 1/SC 34 (ISO/IEC Joint Technical Committee 1, Subcommittee 34 - Document description and processing languages).

DSDL defines a modular set of specifications for describing the document structures, data types, and data relationships in structured information resources.

 Part 2: Regular-grammar-based validation – RELAX NG
 Part 3: Rule-based validation – Schematron
 Part 4: Namespace-based Validation Dispatching Language (NVDL)
 Part 5: Extensible Datatypes 
 Part 7: Character Repertoire Description Language (CREPDL)
 Part 8: Document Semantics Renaming Language (DSRL)
 Part 9: Namespace and datatype declaration in Document Type Definitions (DTDs) (Datatype- and namespace-aware DTDs)
 Part 11: Schema Association

See also 
 RELAX NG
 Schematron
 DTD
 NVDL
 W3C Schema

References

External links 
 Home page for DSDL Archived from the original on 2016-01-22.
 ISO/IEC 19757-2:2003 - Information technology -- Document Schema Definition Language (DSDL) -- Part 2: Regular-grammar-based validation -- RELAX NG

Data modeling languages
ISO/IEC standards
XML
XML-based standards